Ella Jenkins (born August 6, 1924) is an American folk singer and actress. Dubbed "The First Lady of the Children's Folk Song" by the Wisconsin State Journal, she has been a leading performer of children's music for over fifty years. Her album, Multicultural Children's Songs (1995), has long been the most popular Smithsonian Folkways release.  She has appeared on numerous children's television programs and in 2004, she received a Grammy Lifetime Achievement Award.

Family and personal life
Jenkins was born in St. Louis, Missouri and grew up in predominantly lower-middle-class neighborhoods in the south side of Chicago. Although she received no formal musical training, she benefited from her rich musical surroundings. Her uncle Floyd Johnson introduced her to the harmonica and the blues of such renowned musicians as T-Bone Walker, Memphis Slim and Big Bill Broonzy. Her family frequently moved around the south side and, as she moved to different neighborhoods, she learned new children's rhythms, rhymes and games. Gospel music became a part of her soundscape as neighborhood churches broadcast their services onto the street. She also enjoyed tap dancing lessons at the local theater and was able to go to the Regal Theater to see such performers as Cab Calloway, Count Basie, and Peg Leg Bates. Cab Calloway is the person who she credits with getting her interested in call and response singing. While attending Woodrow Wilson Junior College, she became interested in the music of other cultures through her Mexican, Cuban and Puerto Rican friends. In 1951, she earned a Bachelor of Arts in Sociology with minors in Child Psychology and Recreation from San Francisco State University. Here, she picked up songs of the Jewish culture from her roommates. Upon graduating, she returned to Chicago where she began her career.

Career
In Chicago, Jenkins began writing songs for children while volunteering in recreation centers. She subsequently was hired as a Teenage Program Director for the YWCA in 1952. While working at the YWCA, she was invited to perform on the Chicago public television show, The Totem Club. She was soon offered a regular job as the host of its Thursday program, which she entitled This is Rhythm. She invited guests from diverse cultures to share their music's rhythms on her show.

In 1956, Jenkins decided to become a full-time freelance musician, a vocation she has pursued for over 50 years. She began her career as a children's musician touring school assemblies in the United States, often sleeping in a different place each night and encountering racial discrimination. As she performed in more varied venues, she began to write music about her experiences. Later that year, a friend recommended that she bring a demo tape to Moses Asch, the founder of Folkways Records. Asch was receptive to her music and in 1957, her first album, Call-And-Response: Rhythmic Group Singing, was released by Folkways. Since then, Folkways Records and, more recently, Smithsonian Folkways Recordings have released 39 albums, including the popular You'll Sing a Song and I'll Sing a Song. Her 1995 album Multicultural Children's Songs is the most popular Smithsonian Folkways release to date. She has not only been an important force in children's lives, but in the lives of parents and fellow music educators as well. She has participated in many conferences on music education, and has offered workshops for music educators, parents, and caregivers all over the world.

As a performer and educator, Jenkins has traveled extensively, performing her songs on all seven continents (even Antarctica). As she travels, she not only shares her music and experiences but also learns about the cultures of the people she is visiting, taking with her musical traditions and languages that she then shares with her audiences. She has also made television appearances on shows including NBC's Today Show, CNN's Showbiz Today, and PBS programs such as Barney & Friends, Mister Rogers' Neighborhood, The Me Too Show, Look at Me, and in films shown on Sesame Street. She performed at America's Reunion on the Mall in 1993, America's Millennium Celebration in 2000, and at Smithsonian's 150th Birthday Party on the Mall in Washington, DC in 1996. In collaboration with the John F. Kennedy Center for the Performing Arts, she has acted as a U.S. delegate to Hong Kong, the People's Republic of China, and the former Soviet Union.

As a recording artist, Jenkins has gained extensive recognition. Her recordings have received Parents' Choice awards and two Grammy Award nominations in the category of Best Musical Album for Children. In 2004, she was recognized with a Grammy Lifetime Achievement Award.

As an educator

Jenkins' favorite people are children. She sees them as genuine, down to earth people who should be listened to and recognized as having much to offer. Fellow music educator Patricia Sheehan Campbell lauds her as "a pioneer in her early and continuing realization that children have something to sing about, that the essence of who they are may be expressed through song, and that much of what they need to know of their language, heritage, and current cultural concepts may be communicated to them through song." Through her songs, she hopes to develop greater intercultural understanding and rhythmic-consciousness, and to help people discover the joy of singing and communicating through active participation in songs.

Jenkins' repertoire includes nursery rhymes, holiday songs, bilingual songs, African-American folk songs, international songs, rhythmic chants, and original songs. Drawing from cultures all over the world, she sings in many languages, exposing her audiences to diverse cultures and promoting greater cultural awareness.

Through her style of call-and-response singing, Jenkins promotes group participation. Found in cultures worldwide, from Greece to the Middle East to West Africa, call-and-response singing involves a leader or leaders singing a phrase and the rest of the participants commenting or responding with another phrase. Using this technique, she breaks the barrier between audience and performer, and turns everyone into a performer. By encouraging active participation, she promotes the development of a warm group feeling, cooperation among the participants, greater attentiveness, an enjoyment of singing, and a desire to sing. She also encourages children to lead songs, make up their own variations of songs, and experiment with fun and silly sounds. This allows children to think independently, develop leadership skills, and improvise, resulting in increased self-confidence.

In helping children discover music and participate in its creation, Jenkins provides them with a new tool of communication that they can use and enjoy for the rest of their lives.

Awards
 Lifetime Achievement Award from the American Society of Composers, Authors, and Publishers Foundation (First recipient in the field of Children's Music and the first woman selected for the honor) (1999)
 Grammy Nomination for Best Musical Album for Children for Ella Jenkins and a Union of Friends (1999)
 Award from the Music Educators National Conference "in appreciation of her support for music education and the National Association for Music Education" (2000)
 Grammy Association Lifetime Achievement Award (2004)
 Honorary Doctorate of Human Letters from the Erikson Institute (2004)
 Inducted into the San Francisco State University Alumni Hall of Fame (2004)
 Grammy Nomination for Best Musical Album for Children for Sharing Cultures with Ella Jenkins (2005)
 Voted 2005 Chicagoan of the year by Chicago Magazine
 Fellow Award in Music from United States Artists (2009)
 National Endowment for the Arts Grant, with Illinois Arts Council matching grant
 Named Honorary Citizen of Louisville, KY, during The Year of the Child 
 National Academy of Recordings Arts and Sciences, Chicago Chapter, Governor's Award, contribution in children's recording and performance 
 Proclamation of Ella Jenkins Day (December 12) in Chicago, IL 
 American Academy of Children's Entertainment, Best Variety Performer Award
 American Library Association Award
 Fifth Star Award from the City of Chicago (2015)
 National Heritage Fellowship recipient (2017)

Discography

1950s and 1960s
1957: Call-and-Response Rhythmic Group Singing  (1990) Reissue of FW7638 from 1957. SFW45030 (LP, Cassette, CD).
1959: Adventures in Rhythm  (1989) Reissue of FW7682 from 1959. SFW45007 (LP, Cassette, CD).
1960: African-American Folk Rhythms  (1998) Reissue of Negro Folk Rhythms FW7654 from 1960. SFW45003 (LP, Cassette, CD).
1961: This-a-Way-That-a-Way  (1989) Reissue of FW7652 from 1961. SFW45002 (LP, Cassette, CD).
1961: This is Rhythm  (1994) Reissue of FW7652 from 1961. SFW45028 (LP, Cassette, CD).
1964: Rhythm & Game Songs for Little Ones  (1991) Reissue of FW7680 from 1964. SFW45027 (LP, Cassette, CD).
1964: Songs and Rhythms From Near and Far  (1997) Reissue of FW7655 from 1964. SFW45033 (LP, Cassette, CD).
1966: You'll Sing a Song and I'll Sing a Song  (1989) Reissue of FW7664 from 1966. SFW45010 (LP, Cassette, CD).
1968: Play Your Instruments & Make a Pretty Sound  (1994) Reissue of FW7665 from 1968. SFW45018 (LP, Cassette, CD).
1969: Counting Games & Rhythms for the Little Ones  (1990) Reissue of FW7679 from 1969. SFW45029 (LP, Cassette, CD).
1969: A Long Time to Freedom  (1992) Reissue of FW7754 from 1969. SFW45034 (LP, Cassette, CD).

1970s
1970: Rhythms of Childhood  (1989) Reissue of FW7653 from 1963. SFW45008 (LP, Cassette, CD).
1970: Seasons for Singing  (1990) Reissue of FW7656 from 1970. SFW45031 (LP, Cassette, CD).
1970: A Long Time to Freedom  (1992) Reissue of FW7754 from 1970. SFW45034 (LP, Cassette, CD).
1971: And One And Two & Other Songs for Pre-School and Primary Children  (1990) Reissue of FW7544 from 1971. SFW45016 (LP, Cassette, CD).
1971: My Street Begins at My House  (1989) Reissue of FW7543 from 1971. SFW45005 (LP, Cassette, CD).
1972: Little Johnny Brown  (1990) Reissue FW7631 from 1972. SFW45026 (LP, Cassette, CD).
1973: This-A-Way That-A-Way (1973) Folkways FC 7546. (Vinyl LP, Cassette, CD)
1974: Nursery Rhymes: Rhyming & Remembering for Young Children & for Older Girls & Boys with Special Language Needs  (1990) Reissue of FW7660 from 1974. SFW45019 (LP, Cassette, CD).
1974: Jambo and Other Call and Response Songs and Chants  (1996) Reissue of FW7661 from 1974. SFW 45017 (LP, Cassette, CD).
1976: Growing Up With Ella Jenkins  (1990) Reissue of FW7662 from 1976. SFW45032 (LP, Cassette, CD).
1977: Songs, Rhythms And Chants for the Dance  (2000) Reissue of FW7000AB from 1977. SFW45004 (LP, Cassette, CD).
1979: Travellin' with Ella Jenkins: – A Bilingual Journey  (1989) Reissue of FW7640 from 1979. SFW45009 (LP, Cassette, CD).

1980s 
1981: I Know the Colors of the Rainbow  (1981) EA595 (CD).
1981: Looking Back and Looking Forward  (1981) EA596 (CD).
1982: Early Early Childhood Songs  (1996) Reissue of FW7630 from 1982. SFW45015 (LP, Cassette, CD).
1983: Hopping Around from Place to Place Vol. 1  (1983) EA613 (CD).
1983: Hopping Around from Place to Place Vol. 2  (1983) EA614 (CD).
1989: This-a-Way, This-a-Way"  (1988) SFW45002 (LP, Cassette, CD).
1989: My Street Begins at my House  (1989) SFW45005 (LP, Cassette, CD).
1989: Adventure in Rhythm  (1989) SFW45007 (LP, Cassette, CD).
1989: Rhythm of Childhood  (1989) SFW45008 (LP, Cassette, CD).
1989: You'll Sing a Song, I'll Sing a Song  (1989) SFW45010 (LP, Cassette, CD).

 1990s 
1990: We Are America's Children  (1990) Reissue of FW7666. SFW45006 (LP, Cassette, CD).
1990: And One and Two  (1990) SFW45016 (LP, Cassette, CD).
1990: Nursery Rhymes: Rhyming & Remembering for Young Children & for Older Girls & Boys with Special Language Needs  (1990) SFW45019 (LP, Cassette, CD).
1990: Counting Games and Rhythms For the Little Ones  (1990) SFW45029 (LP, Cassette, CD).
1990: Call and Response  (1990) SFW45030 (LP, Cassette, CD).
1990: Seasons for Singing  (1990) SFW45031 (Cassette, CD).
1991: Live at the Smithsonian  (1991) SFW48001 (VHS, DVD).
1991: For the Family  (1991) SFW48002 (VHS, DVD).
1991: Little Johnny Brown with Ella Jenkins and Girls and Boys from "Uptown" ( Chicago)  (1991) SFW45026 (Cassette, CD).
1991: Rhythm and Game Songs for the Little Ones  (1991) SFW45027 (Cassette, CD).
1992: Come Dance by the Ocean  (1992) SFW45014 (LP, Cassette, CD).
1994: Play Your Instruments and Make a Pretty Sound  (1994) SFW45018 (LP, Cassette, CD).
1994: This is Rhythm  (1994) SFW45028 (LP, Cassette, CD).
1995: Multi-Cultural Children's Songs  (1995) SFW45045 (LP, Cassette, CD).
1996: Early Early Childhood Songs  (1996) SFW45015 (LP, Cassette, CD).
1996: Jambo and Other Call and Response Songs and Chants  (1996) SFW45017 (LP, Cassette, CD).
1996: Holiday Times  (1996) SFW45041 (Cassette, CD).
1996: Songs Children Love To Sing  (1996) SFW45042 (Cassette, CD).
1997: Songs and Rhythms from Near and Far  (1997) SFW45033 (Cassette, CD).
1999: Ella Jenkins and A Union of Friends Pulling Together  (1999) SFW45046 (LP, Cassette, CD).

2000s and 2010s
2000: Song Rhythms and Chants for the Dance with Ella Jenkins; Interviews with "Dance People"  (2000) SFW45004 (Cassette, CD).
2003: Sharing Cultures With Ella Jenkins  (2003) SFW45058 (CD).
2004: cELLAbration: A Tribute to Ella Jenkins  (2004) SFW45059 (CD).
2011: A Life of Song  (2011) SFW45067 (CD)
2013: Get Moving with Ella Jenkins  (2013) SFW45073 (CD).
2014: 123s and ABCs  (2014) SFW45076 (CD)
2014: More Multicultural Children's Songs  (2014) SFW45078 (CD)
2017: Camp Songs with Ella Jenkins and Friends (2017) (CD)

Filmography
1991: Ella Jenkins Live at the Smithsonian  (1991) SFW48001 (VHS, DVD).
1991: For the Family!  (1991) SFW48002 (VHS, DVD).
2007: cELLAbration Live! A Tribute to Ella Jenkins''  (2007) SFW48007 (DVD).

References

External links
 
 Ella Jenkins at Folkways Recordings
 History Makers Biography
 Ella Jenkins's oral history video excerpts at The National Visionary Leadership Project
Ella Jenkins Interview – NAMM Oral History Library (2015)
 Gayle Wald on Ella Jenkins, PMBiP, 29/11/22. "PMBiP" is "Popular Music Books in Progress".

1924 births
Living people
African-American actresses
African-American women singer-songwriters
Musicians from St. Louis
American actresses
American children's musicians
American folk singers
African-American guitarists
Grammy Lifetime Achievement Award winners
American music educators
American women music educators
Singer-songwriters from Missouri
Guitarists from Missouri
National Heritage Fellowship winners
20th-century American guitarists
San Francisco State University alumni
Educators from Missouri
20th-century American women guitarists
20th-century African-American women
20th-century African-American people
20th-century African-American musicians
21st-century African-American people
21st-century African-American women